Gustav Edvin Larsson (24 January 1925 – 4 April 2009) was a Swedish theologian.

Publishing Christus als Vorbild in 1962, he took the dr.theol. degree. He was a docent at Uppsala University from 1962 and then professor at the MF Norwegian School of Theology from 1966 to 1992. He was a member of the Norwegian Academy of Science and Letters from 1986.

He was born in Burträsk and died in April 2009 in Uppsala.

References

1925 births
2009 deaths
Swedish theologians
Swedish expatriates in Norway
Academic staff of Uppsala University
Academic staff of the MF Norwegian School of Theology, Religion and Society
Members of the Norwegian Academy of Science and Letters